Nalini Joshi  is an Australian mathematician. She is a professor in the School of Mathematics and Statistics at the University of Sydney, the first woman in the School to hold this position, and is a past-president of the Australian Mathematical Society.

Joshi is a member of the School's Applied Mathematics Research Group. Her research concerns integrable systems. She was awarded the Georgina Sweet Australian Laureate Fellowship in 2012. Joshi is also the Vice-President of the International Mathematical Union, and is the first Australian to hold this position.

Early life
Joshi was born and spent her childhood in Burma.
In 2007, she described her experience growing up there:

Education

Joshi attended Fort Street High School and gained her Bachelor of Science with honours in 1980 at the University of Sydney, and her PhD at Princeton University under the supervision of Martin David Kruskal.

Her PhD thesis was entitled The Connection Problem for the First and Second Painlevé Transcendents.

Career
After a postdoctoral fellowship in 1987 and a research fellowship and lectureship (1988–90), both at the Australian National University, Joshi took up a lectureship at the University of New South Wales in Sydney (1990–94) and was promoted to senior lecturer in 1994.
In 1997, she won an Australian Research Council (ARC) senior research fellowship, which she took up at the University of Adelaide, and became an associate professor/reader at that university a year later.
In 2002 she moved to the University of Sydney as Chair of Applied Mathematics; since 2006 she has been director of the Centre for Mathematical Biology, from 2007 to 2009 head of the School of Mathematics and Statistics (associate head since 2010).

In 2015, Joshi co-founded and co-chaired the Science in Australia Gender Equity (SAGE) program, which works to increase retention of women in STEM fields using Athena SWAN principles.
Since 2016, she has served as a member of the SAGE Expert Advisory Group.

Awards and honors 
Joshi was elected a fellow of the Australian Academy of Science in March 2008, and has held a number of positions in the Australian Mathematical Society, including its presidency from December 2008 to September 2010.
She was also a board member of the Australian Mathematics Trust (2010–13)
She has been on the National Committee for Mathematical Sciences since January 2010.

In 2012, Joshi became a Georgina Sweet Australian Laureate Fellow, which involves the five-year project, Geometric construction of critical solutions of nonlinear systems.

In 2015, she was the 150th Anniversary Hardy Lecturer, an award by the London Mathematical Society involving an extensive series of lectures throughout the United Kingdom. She is a Fellow of the Royal Society of New South Wales (FRSN). In June 2016, she was appointed an Officer of the Order of Australia.

Joshi was elected vice-president of the International Mathematical Union in July 2018. She was recognised in the October 2019 NSW Premier's Prizes for "Excellence in Mathematics, Earth Sciences, Chemistry or Physics".

In 2020, Joshi was awarded the George Szekeres Medal from the Australian Mathematical Society. She was awarded the 2021 ANZIAM Medal by Australia and New Zealand Industrial and Applied Mathematics for "unparalleled contributions to applied mathematics in leadership, gender equity, and promotion of mathematics."

References

External links
 Nalini Joshi at the University of Sydney
 Video about Joshi (March 2012)
 Sydney Morning Herald 30 March 2016: "Top Sydney University mathematician Nalini Joshi laments gender discrimination"

21st-century Australian mathematicians
Academic staff of the University of Sydney
Australian women mathematicians
Australian people of Burmese descent
Living people
Fellows of the Australian Academy of Science
Fellows of the Royal Society of New South Wales
University of Sydney alumni
Princeton University alumni
Academic staff of the University of New South Wales
Academic staff of the University of Adelaide
Burmese emigrants to Australia
21st-century women mathematicians
Year of birth missing (living people)
Australian women academics
21st-century Australian women scientists
Officers of the Order of Australia